RFA Cherryleaf (A82) was a Leaf-class fleet support tanker of the Royal Fleet Auxiliary.

Launched in 1953 as Laurelwood, the ship was acquired by the RFA, and renamed Cherryleaf in 1959.

In 1966 the ship was returned to her previous owners and renamed Agios Constantinos. She was renamed Aeas in 1967, and as Irene's Fortune in 1972. She was scrapped on 13 December 1975.

References

Tankers of the Royal Fleet Auxiliary
Leaf-class tankers
1953 ships